The Cessna Model 411 is an American twin-engined, propeller-driven light aircraft built by Cessna Aircraft. It was that company's largest business aircraft to enter production when it first flew in 1962.

Design and development

The 411 is an eight-seat low-wing twin-engined cabin monoplane retractable landing gear and an airstair entrance door. It has two  Continental GTSIO-520-C engines with three-bladed propellers. It has a retractable tricycle landing gear and an airstair door. The prototype first flew on 18 July 1962.  During 1965 Cessna developed two generally similar and lower-cost versions, the Model 401 and Model 402. Production of the 411 finished in 1968. A pressurized version of the 411 was developed as the Cessna 421.

Variants
Cessna 411
Production variant, obtained type certificate awarded in 1964, 252-built.
Cessna 411A
A 411 with larger nose baggage capacity but the same overall length fuselage and optional tanks in engine nacelles, type certificate awarded in 1967, 50 built.

Operators

Military operators

 French Air Force - Six 411s were delivered between 1966 and 1969 as communications aircraft, the four surviving aircraft were transferred to the CEV in 1973 and 1974. Two were used by Groupe de Liaisons Aériennes Ministérielles for VIP transport duties.

Specifications

See also

References
Notes

Bibliography

External links

 Specs and photo on Flugzeuginfo.net

411
1960s United States civil utility aircraft
Low-wing aircraft
Aircraft first flown in 1962
Twin piston-engined tractor aircraft